In geometry, a set of points are said to be concyclic (or cocyclic) if they lie on a common circle. All concyclic points are at the same distance from the center of the circle. Three points in the plane that do not all fall on a straight line are concyclic, but four or more such points in the plane are not necessarily concyclic.

Bisectors
In general the centre O of a circle on which points P and Q lie must be such that OP and OQ are equal distances. Therefore O must lie on the perpendicular bisector of the line segment PQ. For n distinct points there are n(n − 1)/2 bisectors, and the concyclic condition is that they all meet in a single point, the centre O.

Cyclic polygons

Triangles

The vertices of every triangle fall on a circle. (Because of this, some authors define "concyclic" only in the context of four or more points on a circle.) The circle containing the vertices of a triangle is called the circumscribed circle of the triangle. Several other sets of points defined from a triangle are also concyclic, with different circles; see Nine-point circle and Lester's theorem.

The radius of the circle on which lie a set of points is, by definition, the radius of the circumcircle of any triangle with vertices at any three of those points. If the pairwise distances among three of the points are a, b, and c, then the circle's radius is

The equation of the circumcircle of a triangle, and expressions for the radius and the coordinates of the circle's center, in terms of the Cartesian coordinates of the vertices are given here and here.

Quadrilaterals

A quadrilateral ABCD with concyclic vertices is called a cyclic quadrilateral; this happens if and only if  (the  inscribed angle theorem) which is true if and only if the opposite angles inside the quadrilateral are supplementary. A cyclic quadrilateral with successive sides a, b, c, d and semiperimeter s = (a + b + c + d) / 2 has its circumradius given by

an expression that was derived by the Indian mathematician Vatasseri Parameshvara in the 15th century.

By Ptolemy's theorem, if a quadrilateral is given by the pairwise distances between its four vertices A, B, C, and D in order, then it is cyclic if and only if the product of the diagonals equals the sum of the products of opposite sides: 

 

If two lines, one  containing segment AC and the other containing segment BD, intersect at X, then the four points A, B, C, D are concyclic if and only if

The intersection X may be internal or external to the circle. This theorem is known as power of a point.

Polygons

More generally, a polygon in which all vertices are concyclic is called a cyclic polygon. A polygon is cyclic if and only if the perpendicular bisectors of its edges are concurrent.

Variations
Some authors consider collinear points (sets of points all belonging to a single line) to be a special case of concyclic points, with the line being viewed as a circle of infinite radius. This point of view is helpful, for instance, when studying inversion through a circle and Möbius transformations, as these transformations preserve the concyclicity of points only in this extended sense.

In the complex plane (formed by viewing the real and imaginary parts of a complex number as the x and y Cartesian coordinates of the plane), concyclicity has a particularly simple formulation: four points in the complex plane are either concyclic or collinear if and only if their cross-ratio is a real number.

Other properties
A set of five or more points is concyclic if and only if every four-point subset is concyclic. This property can be thought of as an analogue for concyclicity of the Helly property of convex sets.

Examples

Triangles

In any triangle all of the following nine points are concyclic on what is called the nine-point circle: the midpoints of the three edges, the feet of the three altitudes, and the points halfway between the orthocenter and each of the three vertices.

Lester's theorem states that in any scalene triangle, the two Fermat points, the nine-point center, and the circumcenter are concyclic.

If lines are drawn through the Lemoine point parallel to the sides of a triangle, then the six points of intersection of the lines and the sides of the triangle are concyclic, in what is called the Lemoine circle.

The van Lamoen circle associated with any given triangle  contains the circumcenters of the six triangles that are defined inside  by its three medians.

A triangle's circumcenter, its Lemoine point, and its first two Brocard points are concyclic, with the segment from the circumcenter to the Lemoine point being a diameter.

Other polygons

A polygon is defined to be cyclic if its vertices are all concyclic. For example, all the vertices of a regular polygon of any number of sides are concyclic.

A tangential polygon is one having an inscribed circle tangent to each side of the polygon; these tangency points are thus concyclic on the inscribed circle.

A convex quadrilateral is orthodiagonal (has perpendicular diagonals) if and only if the midpoints of the sides and the feet of the four altitudes are eight concyclic points, on what is called the eight-point circle.

References

External links 
 
Four Concyclic Points by Michael Schreiber, The Wolfram Demonstrations Project.

Elementary geometry
Incidence geometry